Big Bell may refer to:
 Big Bell, Western Australia, a ghost town in Western Australia
 Big Bell Gold Mine, a gold mine in Western Australia
 Big Bell Temple, a Buddhist temple located in Beijing, China